SS Ganges was a 3,475-ton steamship, built for the Nourse Line by Charles Connell and Company of Glasgow and launched on 9 March 1906. She made seven trips carrying Indian indentured labourers from Calcutta and Madras to Fiji, ten trips to Trinidad and also trips to Surinam.

Namesakes
SS Ganges was the third Nourse Line ship to be named Ganges. The first Ganges was built in 1861 and wrecked in 1881. The second Ganges was built in 1885 and sold to Norway in 1904.

Voyages

Having been in operation during the last years of the Indian indenture system, Ganges was the last ship to carry Indian indentured labourers to Trinidad and to British Guiana, docking in Georgetown on 18 April 1917.

First World War
Between 7 and 31 August 1914 Ganges was requisitioned for use as a Royal Navy collier; and from September of the same year to the following January became an Indian Expeditionary Force transport. For periods of 1916 and 1917 she was requisitioned to transport various bulk cargoes including coal, sugar and wheat. From 6 January 1918 until 19 April 1919 she came under the Liner Requisition Scheme.

Later history
Ganges was sold out of the fleet in 1928 to F. B. Saunders of London who sold her on the following year to Sea Products of London. She became Seapro in 1930 and served for a further four years before being sold for breaking to Thos. W. Ward in 1934.

Notable passengers 
The parents of Fiji Indian businessman Sir Sathi Narain, Devara Suramma (Emigration Pass No. 52043) and Gompa Appalasamy (Emigration Pass No. 51617), arrived on this ship from India to Fiji in 1913. Abdul Wahid who ran as a Mayoral Candidate in Tracy, USA. His grandfather Ali Mohammed f/n Mehardad was one of the indentured labor who came at the age of 20.

See also 
Indian Indenture Ships to Fiji
Indian indenture system

References

External links 

History of Suriname
Indian indentureship in Trinidad and Tobago
Indian indenture ships to Fiji
1906 ships